Denis Boucher (born March 7, 1968) is a Canadian former professional baseball starting pitcher. He played in Major League Baseball (MLB) for the Toronto Blue Jays, Cleveland Indians, and Montreal Expos. He represented Canada at the 1987 Pan American Games. After retirement he went to work for Air Canada in Montreal, before becoming a scout in 2019.  He is currently a scout for the New York Yankees.

Boucher served as the pitching coach for the Canada national team at the 2006 World Baseball Classic. He was the pitching coach of the Canada national team for the Beijing 2008 Summer Olympics. Boucher is one of only four Canadians to have played for both the Toronto Blue Jays and Montreal Expos, the others being Matt Stairs, Rob Ducey and Shawn Hill.

He now lives in Montreal (Lachine), where he is developing youth baseball programs.

Boucher ran as a candidate for Ensemble Montréal for Lachine Borough Council in the 2021 Montreal municipal election.

References

External links

1968 births
Living people
Adirondack Lumberjacks players
Baseball people from Quebec
Baseball players at the 1987 Pan American Games
Canada national baseball team players
Canadian baseball coaches
Canadian expatriate baseball players in the United States
Cleveland Indians players
Colorado Springs Sky Sox players
Dunedin Blue Jays players
Harrisburg Senators players
Las Vegas Stars (baseball) players
Major League Baseball pitchers
Major League Baseball players from Canada
Montreal Expos players
Myrtle Beach Blue Jays players
New York Yankees scouts
Ottawa Lynx players
Pan American Games competitors for Canada
Baseball players from Montreal
Syracuse Chiefs players
Toronto Blue Jays players
Washington Nationals scouts
West Palm Beach Expos players
Canadian sportsperson-politicians